Hakimabad Rural District is a rural district (dehestan) in the Central District of Zarandieh County, Markazi Province, Iran. At the 2006 census, its population was 8,327, in 2,183 families. The rural district has 55 villages.

References 

Rural Districts of Markazi Province
Zarandieh County